Otogelin is a protein that in humans is encoded by the OTOG gene.

Function

The protein encoded by this gene is a component of the acellular membranes of the inner ear. Disruption of the orthologous mouse gene shows that it plays a role in auditory and vestibular functions. It is involved in fibrillar network organization, the anchoring of otoconial membranes and cupulae to the neuroepithelia, and likely in sound stimulation resistance. Mutations in this gene cause autosomal recessive nonsyndromic deafness, type 18B. Alternative splicing of this gene results in multiple transcript variants. [provided by RefSeq, May 2014].

Deafness
If people don't have otogelin or otogelin-like they are born with mild or moderate deafness.

References

Further reading